Balls to the Wall is a 2011 American comedy film written by Jason Nutt and directed by Penelope Spheeris. The film had its premiere at the Newport Beach Film Festival on April 30, 2011.

Plot
An engaged guy is forced by his future father-in-law to take a side job moonlighting as an exotic dancer in order to pay for an extravagant wedding neither of them can afford.

Cast
Joe Hursley as Ben Camelino 
Jenna Dewan as Rachel Matthews 
Mimi Rogers as Mrs. Matthews 
Christopher McDonald as Mr. Matthews 
Colleen Camp as Maureen 
Antonio Sabato Jr. as Uncle Sven 
Nic Few as The Iceman
Matthew Felker as Chad Goldstein
Dustin Ybarra as Lewis Gardener
Raymond O'Connor as Bernie Niles
Freda Foh Shen as Miss Watson

References

External links
 
 

2011 films
American comedy films
Films shot in Los Angeles
Films directed by Penelope Spheeris
Films scored by William Ross
2011 comedy films
2010s English-language films
2010s American films